Issaries can refer to:

 Issaries, Inc., a role-playing game publishing house
 Issaries, the fictional Lightbringer god of trade in the Glorantha setting of the role-playing game RuneQuest